Logfia filaginoides (formerly Filago californica), also called herba impia or cottonrose, is a small annual plant in the family Asteraceae, found in the Southwestern United States.

Range and habitat
It grows throughout Southern California to Texas and Mexico. In the Mojave Desert, it grows in creosote bush scrub and Joshua tree woodlands.

Growth pattern
It is a hairy, erect, annual plant growing between 2" and 12" tall.

Leaves and stems
Its - to -inch-long leaves are attached to the stems without a little stem (petiole) at the bottom of the leaf (sessile).

Flowers
The -inch flower heads are surrounded by upper leaves of about the same length as the head. Each head has tiny reddish-purple disk flowers with the outer 8–10 being all female.

Fruits
Fruits are tiny, flattened achenes with a ring of pappus bristles, falling off as a unit.

References

Gnaphalieae